Salthill-Knocknacarra is a Gaelic Athletic Association club based in the Salthill and Knocknacarra areas in Galway City, Ireland. The club is a member of the Galway GAA. Salthill-Knocknacarra GAA Club caters for large numbers of young boys and girls and adults who play  Football, Hurling,  Ladies Football and Camogie in the parishes of Salthill and  Knocknacarra and is one of the largest clubs in the West of Ireland.

History
The club was founded in 1966 under the banner of Cumann Naomh Ciarán. During the 1980s the Club became a major underage force in Galway football under the guidance of Club greats such as Tony Regan and Liam Sammon. This resulted in over ten championships at both minor and U-21 levels being won. This underage success was then transferred onto the Senior stage in 1990 with the Club winning its first Senior football county title followed by a Connaught Club title. The Club lost the All-Ireland Final in 1991 to Lavey of Derry after a spirited effort. Players starring on this team included Alan Mulholland (former Galway Manager), Norman Costello, Cathal McGinley, John Kilraine, Pat Comer (producer of the video "A Year Til Sunday"), Mark Gibbs, and Donners who subsequently managed the Club to an All Ireland title in 2006.

Since the 1980s the Club has always had successful underage teams in football. Minor and U21 finals are regularly contested but the Club did however need to wait under 2005 to win its next County title which was followed by an All Ireland Club title on St Patricks Day in 2006 against St Galls of Antrim, players starring on this team included Finian Hanley, Seán Armstrong, Michael Donnellan, Maurice Sheridan, Séamie Crowe, Alan Kerins to mention only a few.

The Club has historically been recognised widely mainly as a football club in Galway with a great reputation for producing strong underage teams. Hurling in the club has seen rapid engagement and success and has teams which compete at Junior levels and have had their first winning Galway minor in 2009 with Tadhg Haran who starred at midfield at the semi final stage.

The club is well structured at under level in all four codes, with many parents involved in managing teams and organising club activities. Players from the club field on underage county teams every year and some club members such as over the years have represented Galway at adult level. Hurling has been played in the club since the early 1980s and for the last four years has experienced growth. Camogie in Bóthar na Trá celebrated 25 years in 2004 and is now stronger than ever.

Ladies football has flourished in recent years and the club has won titles at underage and junior level, capturing a Junior county title in 2003, and again in 2022 culminating in All-Ireland success with players now playing for Galway on the intercounty stage. The club's finest hour came in 2006 when Salthill-Knocknacarra won the All-Ireland Senior Club Football Championship title defeating St. Galls of Antrim in the final.

Salthill-Knocknacarra hosted Prince William and  Catherine, Duchess of Cambridge in March 2020, the first visit by any members of the British royal family to a GAA club in Ireland (though previous visitors had toured Croke Park).

The clubs ethos is enshrined as Four Codes, One Club, One Community, with the values of Inclusion, Respect, Ambition and Enjoyment.

The club boasts an enviable location with excellent facilities including floodlit playing pitches, Astro turf and an events centre, a focal point for community activities namely: Arus Bóthar na Tra, which facilitates a wide ranging list of daily and weekly events including fitness centre, yoga, pliâtes, dance, drama, art classes, meeting rooms and conference facilities alongside its core functions. As the focal point supporting its GAA and LGFA and more recently Gaelic for Mothers and Others (G4MO)

Football Titles
 Galway Senior Football Championship (3): 1990, 2005, 2012
 Connacht Senior Club Football Championship (2): 1990, 2005
 All-Ireland Senior Club Football Championship (1): 2005/06
 Galway Minor Football Championships (2): 2002, 2011
 All-Ireland Ladies Gaelic Football Junior Champions 2022

Hurling Titles
 Galway Junior Hurling Championship (1): 2021
 Connacht Junior Club Hurling Championship (1): 2021

Notable players
 Seán Armstrong
 Aonghus Callanan
 Gary Cox
 Michael Donnellan
 Gavin Duffy
 Robert Finnerty
 Dora Gorman
 Finian Hanley
 Tadhg Haran
 Alan Kerins
 Alan Mulholland
 Liam Sammon
 Maurice Sheridan
 David Tierney

References

External sources
Club website
http://www.skgaa.ie/index.php?option=com_content&view=category&layout=blog&id=161&Itemid=129

Gaelic games clubs in County Galway
Gaelic football clubs in County Galway
Hurling clubs in County Galway
GAA